Elections to the Shetland Islands Council were held on 5 May 1994 as part of Scottish regional elections.  The Shetland Movement maintained six seats, while the Liberal Democrats gained representation on the council for the first time.  Only ten seats were contested.

Aggregate results

Ward results

By-elections since 1994

References

1994
1994 Scottish local elections